Oldtown is an unincorporated community in Greenup County, in the U.S. state of Kentucky.

History
A post office called Oldtown was established in 1836, and remained in operation until 1992. According to tradition, the community was named for an Indian village at the original town site.

References

Unincorporated communities in Greenup County, Kentucky